Henry Hamilton Hoyt Sr. (June 28, 1895 - November 5, 1990) was the president of Carter products division of Carter-Wallace starting in 1965.

Biography
He was born on June 28, 1895. He had a son, Henry Hamilton Hoyt Jr.

He died on November 5, 1990.

References

1895 births
1990 deaths
Carter-Wallace